Enid Maude Bennett, OJ, CD (May 18, 1931 – December 22, 2017) was a Jamaican politician, representing the Jamaica Labour Party (JLP), who served as Member of Parliament for 30 continuous years until her retirement in 1997.

Early life and education
Bennett was born in Linstead, St. Catherine on May 18, 1931. She was the daughter of James Bennett and Margaret Gordon (née Nattoo). Bennett commenced her education at Linstead Primary School and later attended St. Helen Commercial School.

Political career
Bennett was first elected Parish Councillor for the Sligoville electoral division in the 1956 Parish Council Elections, and later became Member of Parliament for Central St. Catherine in 1967, before moving to represent St. Catherine West Central in 1976. Bennett served as Minister of State in the Ministry of Local Government between 1980 and 1984, and Minister of State in the Ministry of Labour and Social Security between 1984 and 1989.  She was elected the first deputy leader of the JLP in 1978, a post she held until 1999. In December 1997, at the end of her seventh term in office, Bennett retired from active politics at age 66, after 30 years and 10 months of continuous service as an elected Member of Parliament.

Honours and awards

 Bennett  was awarded Jamaica’s fourth-highest honour, the Order of Jamaica, in 2012.
 In 2018, Bog Walk High School in St. Catherine was renamed the Enid Bennett High School in her honour

Personal life and death
Bennett died on December 22, 2017 at age 86 after a brief illness.

See also
 Women in the House of Representatives of Jamaica
 List of female Members of the House of Representatives of Jamaica

References

1931 births
2017 deaths
People from Saint Catherine Parish
Commanders of the Order of Distinction
Government ministers of Jamaica
Jamaica Labour Party politicians
Members of the House of Representatives of Jamaica
Women government ministers of Jamaica
20th-century Jamaican women politicians
20th-century Jamaican politicians